Cathayia obliquella is a species of snout moth in the genus Cathayia. It was described by George Hampson in 1901 and is known from Japan and central China.

References

Moths described in 1901
Galleriini
Moths of Japan
Taxa named by George Hampson